A list of the films produced in Mexico in 1946 (see 1946 in film):

1946

External links

1946
Films
Lists of 1946 films by country or language